Hajjiabad-e Olya or Haji Abad Olya or Hajiabad Olya may refer to:
Hajjiabad-e Olya, Fars
Hajjiabad-e Olya, Hamadan
Hajjiabad-e Olya, Lorestan